The Best of Donnie Vie is a digital-only compilation album of Donnie Vie's solo material.

Track listing 
 Spider Web
 Forever
 I'll Go On
 That's What Love Is
 Wasting Time
 Wrapped Around My Middle Finger
 Wunderland
 Now Ya Know
 Flames of Love
 I Won't Let You Down
 For Your Pleasure
 Light Shine On
 Better Love Next Time
 My Love
 Unforsaken
 You're My Favorite Thing to Do
 Almost Home
 Victory (Demo)
 Habit (Live)
 My Dear Dream (UK Session)
 Time to Let You Go (UK Session)

References 

2015 compilation albums
Donnie Vie albums